Yared Bayeh Belay (born 22 January 1995) is an Ethiopian professional footballer who plays as a centre-back for Ethiopian Premier League club Bahir Dar Kenema and the Ethiopia national team.

References

1995 births
Living people
Ethiopian footballers
Sportspeople from Amhara Region
Association football central defenders
Ethiopia international footballers
Dashen Beer F.C. players
Fasil Kenema S.C. players
2021 Africa Cup of Nations players